Xi Shi (Hsi Shih;) was, according to legends, one of the renowned Four Beauties of ancient China.  She was said to have lived during the end of the Spring and Autumn period in Zhuji, the capital of the ancient State of Yue.

In traditional stories, Xi Shi was named Shi Yiguang (施夷光). She was discovered by the Yue minister Fan Li and given to King Fuchai of Wu by King Goujian of Yue in a sexpionage operation which successfully brought down the State of Wu in 473 BC. This account first appeared in Spring and Autumn Annals of Wu and Yue published five centuries after the conquest, and is completely absent in earlier works such as Guoyu, Zuo zhuan, and Records of the Grand Historian.

Xi Shi, Wang Zhaojun, Diao Chan and Yang Guifei are known as the “Four Beauties in Ancient China”, among which Xi Shi is the first.

Appearance
Xi Shi's beauty was said to be so extreme that while leaning over a balcony to look at the fish in the pond, the fish would be so dazzled that they forgot to swim and sank below the surface. This description serves as the meaning behind the first two characters of the Chinese idiom 沉魚落雁, 閉月羞花, referring to the Four Beauties, which is used to compliment a woman's beauty, meaning one is so beautiful she sinks fish and entices birds to fall, eclipses the moon and shames flowers,.

Story of Xi Shi
King Goujian of Yue was once imprisoned by King Fuchai of Wu after a defeat in war, and Yue later became a tributary state to Wu. Secretly planning his revenge, Goujian's minister Wen Zhong suggested training beautiful women and offering them to Fuchai as a tribute (knowing Fuchai could not resist beautiful women).

Bewitched by the beauty and kindness of Xi Shi and Zheng Dan, Fuchai forgot all about his state affairs and at their instigation, killed his best advisor, the great general Wu Zixu. The strength of Wu dwindled, and in 473 BC Goujian launched his strike and completely routed the Wu army. King Fuchai lamented that he should have listened to Wu Zixu, and then committed suicide.

In the legend, after the fall of Wu, Fan Li (范蠡) retired from his ministerial post and lived with Xi Shi on a fishing boat, roaming like fairies in the misty wilderness of Taihu Lake, and no one saw them ever again. This is according to Yuan Kang's Yue Jueshu (越绝书). Another version, according to Mozi, is that Xi Shi later died from drowning in the river.

Influence
The Xi Shi Temple, which lies at the foot of the Zhu Luo Hill (苎萝) in the southern part of Xiaoshan, on the banks of the Huansha River.

The West Lake in Hangzhou is said to be the incarnation of Xi Shi, hence it is also called Xizi Lake, Xizi being another name for Xi Shi, meaning Lady Xi. In his famous work of Song poetry, Drinks at West Lake through Sunshine and Rain (飲湖上初睛居雨), renowned scholar Su Shi compared Xi Shi's beauty to the West Lake.

Li Bai of the Tang dynasty wrote a poem about Xi Shi.

Xi Shi is mentioned in the novel Journey to the West, as a sign of grace and beauty.

Xi Shi is mentioned in the novel Dream of the Red Chamber, the heroine Lin Daiyu is described as having a sickly appearance like Xi Shi, and has more beauty than her. Both Lin and Xi Shi give readers the image of a beautiful, sickly- looking lady.

Xi Shi appears in the wuxia short story by Jin Yong (Louis Cha), "Sword of the Yue Maiden".

Her name also inspired the modern name of the Shih Tzu, whose Chinese name translates to "Xi Shi dog", but whose English name has been claimed to come from the word for "lion". The moniker "lion dog" in Chinese is actually reserved for the Pekingese.

Xi Shi is referenced in the saying 情人眼里出西施, meaning "beauty is in the eye of the beholder" (literally: "in the eyes of a lover, Xi Shi appears").

References

External links
 A Depiction

Zhou dynasty people
5th-century BC Chinese people
5th-century BC Chinese women
Ancient Chinese women
Wu (state)
Yue (state)
People from Zhuji
Fictional characters from Zhejiang
People whose existence is disputed